Velika Preska is a settlement in the hills west of Dole pri Litiji in central Slovenia. The area is part of the traditional region of Lower Carniola and is now included with the rest of the Municipality of Litija in the Central Sava Statistical Region.

References

External links
Velika Preska on Geopedia

Populated places in the Municipality of Litija